Patuakhali Stadium  is located by the District Commissioner Office, Patuakhali, Bangladesh.

Events

Yearly
 Deputy Gold Cup football
 Volleyball League
 Athletics
 Badminton
 Kabaddi
 Youth Cricket League 
 Senior Cricket League and others.

See also
Stadiums in Bangladesh
List of cricket grounds in Bangladesh
Sheikh Kamal International Stadium, Cox's Bazar
Sheikh Kamal International Stadium, Gopalganj

References

Cricket grounds in Bangladesh
Football venues in Bangladesh